The year 1959 was the 178th year of the Rattanakosin Kingdom of Thailand. It was the 14th year in the reign of King Bhumibol Adulyadej (Rama IX), and is reckoned as year 2502 in the Buddhist Era.

Incumbents
King: Bhumibol Adulyadej
Crown Prince: (vacant)
Prime Minister:
until 9 February: National Revolutionize Council (junta)
starting 9 February: Sarit Thanarat
Supreme Patriarch: (vacant)

Events

January

February

March

April

May

June

July

August

September

October

November

December

Births

Deaths
 9 February - Luang Pu Sodh Candasaro

See also
 List of Thai films of 1959
 1959 in Thai television

References

External links

 
Thailand
Years of the 20th century in Thailand
Thailand
1950s in Thailand